Dunlavin Green is an Irish ballad referring to the Dunlavin Green executions in 1798 of 36 suspected rebels.

Notable recordings 
 1956 – Patrick Galvin – Irish Songs of Resistance Part I
 1975 - Gay Woods and Terry Woods - Backwoods
 1975 – Paddy Mahone – Irish Rebellion Album
 1978 - Christy Moore - The Iron Behind the Velvet
 1986 – Terry Corcoran – Happy to Meet and Sorry to Part
 1998 – Dolores Keane – Night Owl
 2008 – Karan Casey – Ships in the Forest

See also
 Dunlavin

References

Irish folk songs
Ballads of the Irish Rebellion of 1798
Year of song unknown
Songwriter unknown